Derrick Dalley , (born July 22, 1965) is a former Canadian politician in Newfoundland and Labrador, Canada. He served as the Minister of Natural Resources in the provincial cabinet. Dalley has represented the district of The Isles of Notre Dame in the House of Assembly from 2007 until 2015. Before entering politics he worked as a guidance counselor and principal.

Early life
Dalley was born in Twillingate, Notre Dame Bay. He spent his early years in Springdale before returning to Twillingate, where he completed high school. Dalley went on to attend Memorial University of Newfoundland where he completed a Bachelor of Arts degree, with a major in political science, and a Bachelor of Education degree in 1987. In 1992, he completed a master's degree in Guidance and Counseling at the University of New Brunswick. Dalley started his career as a social worker in Twillingate, before becoming a guidance counsellor for several schools on the Baie Verte Peninsula. Dalley eventually moved back to his hometown where he continued his career in education. He became principal of Inter Island Academy of New World Island and guidance counsellor and principal of J. M. Olds Academy of Twillingate.

In 1988, Dalley was named the Newfoundland Senior Hockey Leagues rookie of the year. He also plays softball and has coached and taught hockey to youth.

Politics

Government backbencher
Dalley ran as the Progressive Conservative Party candidate in the 2003 provincial election in the district of Twillingate and Fogo, against Liberal cabinet minister Gerry Reid. Dalley received 44 per cent of the popular vote but was defeated by Reid by roughly 600 votes.

The district was renamed The Isles of Notre Dame for the 2007 provincial election and Dalley once again challenged Reid, who now served as the leader of the Liberal Party. On election night Dalley was declared the winner by just seven votes, in the two person race. Due to Dalley winning by less than 10 votes a judicial recount was required. In November Dalley's win was reaffirmed, with a judge declaring that he had actually defeated Reid by 12 votes. Reid had been the MHA for the district since it was created in 1996. Prior to its creation the area was made up of two separate district, and both of those had only elected a Progressive Conservative on one occasion.

Dalley was appointed as Vice-Chair of the Public Accounts Committee on January 9, 2008. On April 9, 2009, he was appointed Parliamentary Secretary to the Minister of Education, replacing Darin King who was sworn in as Minister of Education.

Minister of Business
On January 13, 2011, Premier Kathy Dunderdale appointed Dalley to cabinet as the Minister of Business. Dalley's first major announcement as minister was a $500,000 loan to help establish a shrimp shell processing facility within his district. Following this announcement, both oppositions parties criticized Dalley's appointment to cabinet. New Democratic Party leader Lorraine Michael said his appointment was in part because of his narrow victory in the 2007 election. Kelvin Parsons, who was the acting Official Opposition Leader, said the announcement showed Dalley was in trouble in his district and that he was appointed to cabinet to help him in the upcoming election. In the October 11, 2011, provincial election Dalley was easily re-elected, winning 68 per cent of the popular vote.

Minister of Tourism, Culture and Recreation
The Department of Business was merged with the Department of Innovation, Trade and Rural Development following the provincial election and Dalley was appointed Minister of Tourism, Culture and Recreation. He held that portfolio for less than a year before moving to the Department of Fisheries and Aquaculture.

Minister of Fisheries and Aquaculture
In an October 19, 2012, cabinet shuffle Dalley replaced Darin King as the Minister of Fisheries and Aquaculture. At the time of Dalley's appointment the department was dealing with a proposal from Ocean Choice International (OCI) that would allow the company to ship out raw product to Europe and Asia in return for processing jobs at the fish plant in Fortune. At the time OCI had 60 seasonal employees working at the Fortune fish plant and planned to create 110 full-time processing jobs if government approved their proposal. Negotiations had been ongoing for nearly a year and at the time of the shuffle Dunderdale said she was unsure if government would reach a deal with OCI. On December 21, 2012, Dalley held a news conference to announce that a deal had been struck with OCI. The deal would create 236 year-round jobs, between the town's plant and on company vessels at sea, for a minimum of five years. In return the company would ship up to 75 per cent of its yellowtail flounder quota overseas and 100 per cent of its redfish quota.

Minister of Natural Resources
In a cabinet shuffle held on October 9, 2013, Dalley was promoted to the Department of Natural Resources. The following day Dalley, along with Premier Dunderdale and executives from Husky Energy, were in Placentia to announce a multibillion-dollar development in the offshore oil industry. The announcement was on the White Rose Extension Project, which would see a graving dock facility complete with gates built in Argentia.

Dalley's district was abolished in 2015 and largely replaced by Lewisporte-Twillingate. Dalley ran in the new district and lost.

Electoral record

|-

|-

|-

|}

Results as The Isles of Notre Dame

|-

|-

|-

|NDP
|Tree Walsh
|align="right"|252
|align="right"|6.17%
|align="right"|
|}

|-

|-

|}

Results as Twillingate and Fogo

|-

|-

|}

References

External links
 Derrick Dalley's PC Party biography

1965 births
Living people
Members of the Executive Council of Newfoundland and Labrador
People from Newfoundland (island)
Progressive Conservative Party of Newfoundland and Labrador MHAs
21st-century Canadian politicians
School counselors
Heads of schools in Canada